Potassium channel, subfamily K, member 7, also known as KCNK7 or K2P7.1 is a protein which is encoded in humans by the KCNK7  gene.  K2P7.1 is a potassium channel containing two pore-forming P domains. Multiple transcript variants encoding different isoforms have been found for this gene.

Function 

This gene encodes a member of the superfamily of potassium channel proteins containing two pore-forming P domains. The product of this gene has not been shown to be a functional channel; It may require other non-pore-forming proteins for activity.

See also
 Tandem pore domain potassium channel

References

Further reading

External links 
 
 
 

Ion channels